Sanjeevani Bhelande is an Indian singer. She is known for her songs from movie Kareeb, Nikamma kiya, her English book and album Meera and me and has given over 2000 live concerts.

Personal life
Sanjeevani’s is a family of Professors. 
She is herself a very good teacher.
She holds a degree in music (Sangeet Visharad), is trained in Odissi and Kathak classical-dance forms. She holds a Masters in Commerce and a Diploma in Mass Communication.

Career

Playback singer Sanjeevani Bhelande has to her credit several original Hindi film songs like "Chori chori Nazrein mili" (Kareeb), "Nikamma kiya", "Yara rub russ jane de" (Socha na tha),  Uljhanoko de diya (Rules), "Makhmali yeh badan" (Road), "Chidiya tu hoti" (Nayak), "Churalo na dil mera Sanam", "Haan judaise", "Tum juda hokar" and many more.

She won the Best playback singer Ashirwad award in 1999 for "Chori chori nazrein mili" and was a Filmfare and Screen nominee for "Churalo na dil mera sanam". Sanjeevani is the first ever winner of Zee TV's "Sa Re Ga Ma" and the first to have been selected for playback in Hindi films from a talent show. Music director Khayyam adjudged her the winner in the 1995 finals of the first season and she was invited by filmmaker Vidhu Vinod Chopra to sing 5 playback songs for his film Kareeb.

Sanjeevani's album and book ‘Meera and Me’ is a genre in itself. She has sung, translated and composed Mirabai’s songs in English.

Sanjeevani has created another unique album ‘Raag in a song’. These are classical based songs. Bandishes recorded in the song format. Her songs "Ghar jane de" and "Latt uljhi" have been appreciated.

Filmography
The list includes the popular songs sung by her in various films, especially [Hindi and Nepali], from 1995 onward.

References

External links

Official website of Sanjeevani

Indian women playback singers
Hindi-language singers
Nepali-language singers from India
Living people
Year of birth missing (living people)
Bollywood playback singers
20th-century Indian singers
20th-century Indian women singers
21st-century Indian singers
21st-century Indian women singers
People from Kolhapur
Women musicians from Maharashtra
Singers from Maharashtra